TTF may refer to:

Science and technology
 TrueType fonts, an outline font standard originally developed by Apple
 Tetrathiafulvalene, an organic compound used in materials science
 Trend type forecast, an aviation weather forecast
 Tumor treating fields (TTFields), a medical therapy to treat cancerous tumors with alternating electric fields

Music
 Ten Thousand Fists, an album by the hard rock band Disturbed
 The Time Frequency, Scottish techno band
 Tunnel Trance Force, a long-running trance mix CD series from Tunnel Records
 Throw the Fight, an American rock band

Other uses
 Tanker Task Force
 Tax transparent fund, the proposed authorised collective investment scheme structure in the UK
 Timber Trade Federation, federation of British timber industries based in London
 Title Transfer Facility, a virtual trading point for natural gas in the Netherlands
 Titus the Fox, a platform game by Titus Interactive
 Custer Airport (IATA code), Monroe, Michigan, US 
 Tuvalu Trust Fund, an international fund developed by Tuvalu
 Typical Tom Fiasco, a seemingly innocuous event that mushrooms into a failure

See also
 Transcription termination factor, RNA polymerase I (TTF1), a protein that regulates transcription of genes
 Thyroid transcription factor 1 (TTF-1), another protein that regulates transcription of genes